Brigadier-General James Herbert Yule   (26 April 1847 – 7 May 1920) was a senior British Army officer who briefly acted as General Officer Commanding the 4th Division during the Second Boer War.

Military career
Yule was commissioned as an ensign in the 11th (North Devonshire) Regiment on 1 December 1865. He was deployed to Afghanistan for service the Second Anglo-Afghan War in 1879, to Burma to help with suppressing the Burmese resistance movement in 1891 and to India for service in the Tirah campaign in 1897.

Yule was then sent to South Africa for service in Second Boer War: he was given command of a brigade in the newly formed 4th Division in Northern Natal in September 1899 and was then given a new command with orders to defend Glencoe in October 1899. The division, which was under the command of Major-General Sir William Penn Symons, launched a frontal attack on the enemy during the Battle of Glencoe on 20 October 1899. However, Symons was seriously wounded, and Yule took over command of the division. Yule managed to secure the target of the attack, Talana Hill, but after finding it impossible to retain possession of the hill, withdrew the division to Ladysmith where it became part of the besieged garrison on 26 October 1899. He sailed for home in January 1900 and was appointed a Companion of the Order of the Bath for his service in South Africa on 27 September 1901.

References

1847 births
1920 deaths
Companions of the Order of the Bath
Devonshire Regiment officers
British Army generals
Military personnel from Nottinghamshire